Paraboea halongensis is a plant in the family Gesneriaceae, native to Vietnam. The specific epithet halongensis is for Hạ Long Bay, where the species is found.

Description
Paraboea halongensis grows as a perennial shrub. The inflorescences bear white flowers.

Distribution and habitat
Paraboea halongensis is endemic to Vietnam, where is it is confined to the islands of Hạ Long Bay, a UNESCO World Heritage Site. Its habitat is in cracks on rocks higher up on the limestone islands.

References

Didymocarpoideae
Endemic flora of Vietnam
Plants described in 2000